Zhao Gang (born 4 January 1971) is a Chinese fencer. He competed in the épée events at the 1996, 2000 and 2004 Summer Olympics.

References

External links
 

1971 births
Living people
Chinese male fencers
Olympic fencers of China
Fencers at the 1996 Summer Olympics
Fencers at the 2000 Summer Olympics
Fencers at the 2004 Summer Olympics
Fencers from Liaoning
Sportspeople from Shenyang
Asian Games medalists in fencing
Fencers at the 1994 Asian Games
Fencers at the 1998 Asian Games
Fencers at the 2002 Asian Games
Asian Games gold medalists for China
Asian Games silver medalists for China
Asian Games bronze medalists for China
Medalists at the 1994 Asian Games
Medalists at the 1998 Asian Games
Medalists at the 2002 Asian Games